Nattbuss 807 (English: Night Bus 807) is a Swedish thriller film based on the real murder of a young skinhead in 1992. The film was released to cinemas in Sweden on 28 February 1997, directed by David Flamholc. The film is based on a true story and events of the 1992 murder of a young boy in Vendelsö during the Stockholm Water Festival. The movie received mixed reviews but gained "cult" status by the younger audience in Sweden.

The movie's script and dialogues are taken directly from the real murder investigation.
Many scenes in the movie and most of the dialogue happened in real life, such as the fights, the hooliganism, the police hearings and many of the pieces of evidence found.

Cast
Jonte Halldén as Kalle
Christian Moscoso as Carlos
Jenny Lindroth as Eva
Johan Svangren as Sören
Fredrik Dolk as Detective Inspector Tomas Falk
Catarina Ackell as Malin
Fadi Ada as Omar
Dominiko Aguirre Fernández as Rodrigo
Rolf Andersson as Torbjörn
Constantin Babar as Tahir
Stina Beck as Sara
Johan Bergenlöv as Lindström
Jonas Carlquist as Jimmy
Joachim Cohen
Eddy Toro Duarte as Roberto
Peter Ekefelt as Bus Driver
Krister Engholm as Black Swede
Sergio Painemal Escobar as Chino

References

External links
 
Nattbuss 807 at Svensk Filmdatabas
Den sanna historien bakom filmen, Målnummer B 2972/92 at lagen.nu

Swedish thriller films
Transport films
1997 films
1990s thriller films
1990s Swedish films